Anteaeolidiella orientalis is a species of sea slug, an aeolid nudibranch. It is a marine gastropod mollusc in the family Aeolidiidae.

Distribution
This species was described from a specimen collected at Noordwachter Island, northwest of Java, Indonesia. Eolidina mannarensis, described from Mandapam, Gulf of Mannar, India, is its junior synonym.

Description
Anteaeolidiella orientalis has been synonymised with Anteaeolidiella indica in the past, but differs from that species in having white rhinophores with red or orange tips.

References

Aeolidiidae
Molluscs of the Indian Ocean
Gastropods described in 1888